Chin Faithes ( b. April 1, 1946), known professionally as Chinakorn Krailat, was a Thai Luk thung singer, and was named National Artist of Thailand in 1999.

Early life 
He was born in Sukhothai Province.

Career 
Beginning as a  singer from "Cheer Ramwong band", he started performing on stage during the 1950s. His first album was "Luk thung Ram Luek" followed by many popular songs including "Phet Luang Nai Salam", "Phet Cha Kad Jai", "Thee Rak Rao Rak Kan Mai Dai", etc including his most popular one "Yor Yot Pra Lor".

He was awarded National Artist of Thailand award, for performing arts (International music) in 1999.

He died from colon cancer on May 18, 2017, at age 70.

References

Chin Faithes
1946 births
2017 deaths
Chin Faithes
Chin Faithes
Chin Faithes
Chin Faithes